Neochthebius vandykei is a species of minute moss beetle in the family Hydraenidae. It is found in North America.

References

Further reading

 

Staphylinoidea
Articles created by Qbugbot
Beetles described in 1924